The Fried Liver Attack, also called the Fegatello Attack (named after an Italian dish), is a chess opening. This opening is a variation of the Two Knights Defense in which White sacrifices a knight for an attack on Black's king. The opening begins with the moves:
 
1. e4 e5 
2. Nf3 Nc6 
3. Bc4 Nf6
4. Ng5 d5
5. exd5 Nxd5?!

This is the Two Knights Defense where White has chosen the offensive line 4.Ng5, but Black's last move is risky (5...Na5, the Polerio Defense, is considered better; other Black choices include 5...b5 and 5...Nd4). Bobby Fischer felt that 6.d4! (the Lolli Attack) was incredibly strong, to the point 5...Nxd5 is rarely played; however, the Fried Liver Attack involves a knight sacrifice on f7, defined by the moves:

6. Nxf7 Kxf7

The opening is popular with younger players who like the name and the aggressive, attacking style. It is classified as code C57 in the Encyclopaedia of Chess Openings.

History
The Fried Liver Attack has been known for many centuries, the earliest known example being a game played by Giulio Cesare Polerio before 1606.

Considerations

Play usually continues 7.Qf3+ Ke6 8.Nc3 (diagram). Black will play 8...Nb4 and follow up with ...c6, bolstering his pinned knight on d5. White can  the b4-knight to abandon protection of the d5-knight with 9.a3, a move Yakov Estrin recommended, but Black is quite strong after 9.a3 Nxc2+ 10.Kd1 Nd4! or 10...Nxa1!? as tried by Šarūnas Šulskis in a 2014 game, so 9.Qe4 or 9.O-O are probably better choices.

White has a strong attack, but it has not yet been proven to be decisive. Because defence is harder to play than attack in this variation, the Fried Liver is dangerous for Black, particularly with shorter time controls.

References

Further reading
 Computer Analysis of the Fried Liver and Lolli, Dan Heisman, Chessbase CHNESO001U
 Re-Fried Liver, by Jon Edwards, Chess Life, July 2009, pp. 32–34.

External links

The Fried Liver Attack blog by GM Boris Alterman
Fried Liver Attack The Chess Website by Kevin Butler

Chess openings